Wark or Wark on Tweed is a village in the English county of Northumberland.

It is on the south bank of the River Tweed, which marks the border between England and Scotland.

Landmarks 
The ruins of Wark on Tweed Castle, originally an early 12th-century motte-and-bailey, lie at the west end of the village.

The Ba Green 
This piece of land is known as the Ba Green. It is said locally that every year the men of Coldstream (to the north of the river) would play mob football with the men of Wark at ba, and the winning side would claim the Ba Green for their country. As Coldstream grew to have a larger population than Wark, the Coldstream men always defeated the Wark men at the game, so the land became a permanent part of Scotland.

Notable people 
Robert Story (poet), 1795-1860

References

External links 

 Images of Wark on Tweed Castle and other M & B Castle sites in Northumberland
 Northumberland Communities

Villages in Northumberland